Dreadnought was an English association football club based in London.

History

The club gave its foundation date as 1875 and its first recorded match was a 3–0 defeat away to Upton Park F.C. in November that year, although Dreadnought turned up with only eight men and had to rely on three un-named substitutes.  

The club's secretaries were from the middle classes - Francis Bacon, also the club's goalkeeper, being a commercial traveller and William Pettigrew, who also played as a right-winger, an engineer.

The club entered the FA Cup on four occasions. In the first round in 1880–81, the club beat Rochester 2–1, but in the second round lost 5–1 at Old Carthusians.  In 1881–82 the club's first round opponents from Caius College withdrew and the club had a bye in the second round, but lost 2-1 at Marlow in the third.

In 1882-83, the club hosted South Reading in the first round, but the match kicked off at 4.15pm because of the late arrival of the visiting  South Reading side.  Although South Reading won 2–1, Dreadnought appealed the result on two grounds; firstly, having had a goal wrongly disallowed; secondly, the game had ended in darkness, which allowed South Reading to score the winner.  The Football Association ordered a replay, which South Reading won again, by the same score, in a "warmly contested" match. 

The last match for the club in the competition was its first round defeat to Old Foresters in 1883–84, a match played at the Forest School in Walthamstow rather than the old boys' regular pitch in Snaresbrook; as a sign that the day of the amateur club at the highest levels was over, the crowd did not exceed 200, when ties in the north were attracting over twenty times that amount.  

The club took part in the first three editions of the London Senior Cup, but only won one tie.  After a 3-0 defeat at Hanover United in the first round of 1884–85, the club reverted to more local football, entering the Essex Senior Cup (which included other clubs from north-east London) until 1886–87.

Colours

The club's colours were described black and white until 1880, and navy and white thereafter.

Ground

The club played at the West Ham Park, using the Upton Tavern for facilities.

References

Association football clubs established in 1875
Defunct football clubs in England
Defunct football clubs in London
1875 establishments in England
Association football clubs established in the 19th century